Puliyanmala is a village in Idukki district of Kerala state, India. The places intersects SH-19 (Munnar-Kumily) and SH-33 (Thodupuzha-Puliyanmala), which are the two important state highways in the district. It comes under the premises of Kattappana municipality and belongs to the newly formed Idukki constituency.

Location 
Puliyanamala is located very close to the border of Theni district in Tamil Nadu. It is about 6 km from Kattappana, 27 km from Kumily, 12 km from Cumbummettu via Annyarthozhu and 15 km from Nedumkandam. The tourist spot at Ramakkalmedu is 17 km distant.

Economy 
Predominantly Puliyanmala is an agricultural village with many vast cardamom plantations. It became the first place in Kerala to have a high-tech slaughterhouse, where 30 cattle can be slaughtered per day.

Institutions 
 Carmel CMI public school
 Navadarsanagram De-addiction centre

See also 
 Vandanmedu
 Anakkara

References 

Villages in Idukki district